Gaspar de Creales Arce (death 1658) was a Roman Catholic prelate who served as Archbishop of Reggio Calabria (1644–1658).

Biography
On 12 December 1644, Gaspar de Creales Arce was appointed during the papacy of Pope Innocent X as Archbishop of Reggio Calabria.
On 27 December 1644, he was consecrated bishop by Gil Carrillo de Albornoz, Cardinal-Priest of San Pietro in Montorio. 
He served as Archbishop of Reggio Calabria until his death in 1658.

References

External links and additional sources
 (for Chronology of Bishops) 
 (for Chronology of Bishops) 

17th-century Roman Catholic archbishops in the Kingdom of Naples
Bishops appointed by Pope Innocent X
1658 deaths